Apisa hildae is a moth of the family Erebidae. It was described by Sergius G. Kiriakoff in 1961. It is found in Namibia.

References

Endemic fauna of Namibia
Moths described in 1961
Syntomini
Insects of Namibia
Erebid moths of Africa